Lawrence Johnson (April 26, 1908 – May 1, 1994) was a member of the Wisconsin State Assembly.

Biography
Johnson was born on April 26, 1908 in Nadeau, Michigan. He graduated from high school in Sturgeon Bay, Wisconsin. He died on May 1, 1994.

Career
Johnson was elected to the Assembly in 1960 and was re-elected in 1962 and 1964. Additionally, he was Clerk of Algoma, Wisconsin and Chairman of the Kewaunee County, Wisconsin Board. He was a Republican.

References

Republican Party members of the Wisconsin State Assembly
20th-century American politicians
1908 births
1994 deaths
People from Menominee County, Michigan
People from Sturgeon Bay, Wisconsin
People from Algoma, Wisconsin